American Traitor: The Trial of Axis Sally is a 2021 American historical drama film directed by Michael Polish, from a screenplay by Vance Owen and Darryl Hicks, based upon the book Axis Sally Confidential by William E. Owen. It is based on the life of Mildred Gillars, an American singer and actor who during World War II broadcast Nazi propaganda to American troops and their families back home. The film stars Al Pacino, Meadow Williams, Swen Temmel, Thomas Kretschmann and Mitch Pileggi.

It was released on May 28, 2021, by Vertical Entertainment and Redbox Entertainment.

Premise
An American woman named Mildred Gillars broadcast Nazi propaganda during World War II. She was dubbed Axis Sally by the American GIs who simultaneously loved and hated her. The story plunges the viewer into the dark underbelly of the Third Reich's hate-filled propaganda machine, Sally's eventual capture, and subsequent trial for treason in Washington D.C. after the war.

Cast
 Al Pacino as James Laughlin, an attorney who represented Gillars after she was put on trial for treason
 Meadow Williams as Mildred Gillars
 Swen Temmel as Billy Owen
 Thomas Kretschmann as Joseph Goebbels
 Mitch Pileggi as John Kelley, the prosecutor at Gillars's trial
 Lala Kent as Elva
 Carsten Norgaard as Max Otto Koischwitz
 Drew Taylor as Randy

Production
In May 2017, it was announced EFO Films had acquired the screenplay Axis Sally by Vance Owen and Darryl Hicks, based upon the book Axis Sally Confidential by Willem E. Owen. In November 2018, Al Pacino, Meadow Williams and Swen Temmel joined the cast of the film, with Michael Polish directing. In February 2019, Thomas Kretschmann, Mitch Pileggi and Lala Kent joined the cast of the film. In April 2019, Carsten Norgaard joined the cast of the film. Kubilay Uner will compose the film's score.

Principal photography took place in Dorado, Puerto Rico, in February 2019.

Release
In April 2021, Vertical Entertainment and Redbox Entertainment acquired North American distribution rights to the film, which had been retitled American Traitor: The Trial of Axis Sally, and set it for release on May 28, 2021.

Reception
The review aggregator website Rotten Tomatoes surveyed  and, categorizing the reviews as positive or negative, assessed three as positive and 18 as negative for a 14% rating. Among the reviews, it determined an average rating of 3.7 out of 10.

Hope Madden of UK Film Review said, "Aside from Pacino, the cast is uniformly awful."

References

External links
 

2021 films
2021 drama films
2020s American films
2020s English-language films
2020s historical drama films
American courtroom films
American films based on actual events
American historical drama films
American World War II films
Cultural depictions of Joseph Goebbels
Cultural depictions of Mildred Gillars
Cultural depictions of Max Otto Koischwitz
Drama films based on actual events
Films about propaganda
Films based on non-fiction books
Films directed by Michael Polish
Films set in 1948
Films set in Washington, D.C.
Films shot in Puerto Rico
Vertical Entertainment films
World War II films based on actual events